Indispensable is a jazz vocal album by Michael Franks released only in markets outside of the U.S.A. in 1988 by Warner Bros. Records. It is Franks' twelfth album, and his first of four compilation releases with the label.

The compilation contains a selection of tracks spanning eleven years, from The Art of Tea in 1976, to The Camera Never Lies in 1987.

Franks has since released eight more studio albums, rendering this compilation a fairly representative sample of his earlier work; of note his collaborations with the Tommy LiPuma and Al Schmitt production team, and later with Rob Mounsey.

Track listing

References

Bibliography

Michael Franks (musician) compilation albums
1988 compilation albums
Warner Records compilation albums